Rambhotlapalem is a village in Guntur district of the Indian state of Andhra Pradesh. It is the located in Cherukupalle mandal of Tenali revenue division. Piped Water Supply scheme under ARWSP, provides water to the residents.

Geography 
Rambhotlapalem is situated to the southwest of the mandal headquarters, Arumbaka,

Demographics 
The village is home to 6,015 people with 1,628 households. The population consists of 2% schedule castes and 3% schedule tribes. It has unhealthy sex ratio of 898 females per 1000 male in the village. The sex ratio of this village decreased drastically by 190 points between 2001-11 particularly alarmingly among SC households.

Government and politics 
Rambhotlapalem gram panchayat is the local self-government of the village. It is divided into wards and each ward is represented by a ward member.

Education 

As per the school information report for the academic year 2018–19, the village has a total of 6 Zilla/Mandal Parishad schools.

See also 
List of villages in Guntur district

References 

Villages in Guntur district